In Greek mythology, Maera or Maira (Ancient Greek: Μαῖρα means "the sparkler") may refer to the following personages:

Humans

 Maera or Mera, one of the 50 Nereids, sea-nymph daughters of the "Old Man of the Sea" Nereus and the Oceanid Doris. She and her other sisters appear to Thetis when she cries out in sympathy for the grief of Achilles at the slaying of his friend Patroclus.
 Maera, daughter of Atlas and ancestor of the below Maera. She was the mother by Tegeates, of Leimon, Scephrus, Archedius, Gortys, and Cydon.
 Maera, descendant of the above Maera.
 Maera, daughter of Proetus, son of Thersander, son of Sisyphus, was still a maid when she died. Otherwise, she was the mother of Locrus by Zeus. In some accounts, Locrus' mother was Megaclite, daughter of Macareus.  Maera's shade appeared to Odysseus when the hero visited the underworld.
 Maera, one of the Erasinides, Argive naiad daughters of the river-god Erasinus. She and her sisters, Anchiroe, Byze and Melite, received Britomartis.
 Maera, priestess of Aphrodite, and mother of two sons killed by Tydeus during the war of the Seven Against Thebes.

Animal

 Maera, name of Hecabe when she was changed into the black bitch of Hecate to spread terror among the Thracians with her howling.
Maera, hound of Erigone.

Notes

References 

 Antoninus Liberalis, The Metamorphoses of Antoninus Liberalis translated by Francis Celoria (Routledge 1992). Online version at the Topos Text Project.
 Apollodorus, The Library with an English Translation by Sir James George Frazer, F.B.A., F.R.S. in 2 Volumes, Cambridge, MA, Harvard University Press; London, William Heinemann Ltd. 1921. ISBN 0-674-99135-4. Online version at the Perseus Digital Library. Greek text available from the same website.
 Gaius Julius Hyginus, Fabulae from The Myths of Hyginus translated and edited by Mary Grant. University of Kansas Publications in Humanistic Studies. Online version at the Topos Text Project.
 Homer, The Iliad with an English Translation by A.T. Murray, Ph.D. in two volumes. Cambridge, MA., Harvard University Press; London, William Heinemann, Ltd. 1924. . Online version at the Perseus Digital Library.
 Homer, Homeri Opera in five volumes. Oxford, Oxford University Press. 1920. . Greek text available at the Perseus Digital Library.
 Pausanias, Description of Greece with an English Translation by W.H.S. Jones, Litt.D., and H.A. Ormerod, M.A., in 4 Volumes. Cambridge, MA, Harvard University Press; London, William Heinemann Ltd. 1918. . Online version at the Perseus Digital Library
 Pausanias, Graeciae Descriptio. 3 vols. Leipzig, Teubner. 1903.  Greek text available at the Perseus Digital Library.
Publius Ovidius Naso, Metamorphoses translated by Brookes More (1859-1942). Boston, Cornhill Publishing Co. 1922. Online version at the Perseus Digital Library.
Publius Ovidius Naso, Metamorphoses. Hugo Magnus. Gotha (Germany). Friedr. Andr. Perthes. 1892. Latin text available at the Perseus Digital Library.
 Publius Papinius Statius, The Thebaid translated by John Henry Mozley. Loeb Classical Library Volumes. Cambridge, MA, Harvard University Press; London, William Heinemann Ltd. 1928. Online version at the Topos Text Project.
 Publius Papinius Statius, The Thebaid. Vol I-II. John Henry Mozley. London: William Heinemann; New York: G.P. Putnam's Sons. 1928. Latin text available at the Perseus Digital Library.

Further reading 

 Aken, Dr. A.R.A. van. (1961). Elseviers Mythologische Encyclopedie. Amsterdam: Elsevier.
 Bartelink, Dr. G.J.M. (1988). Prisma van de mythologie. Utrecht: Het Spectrum.
 Völcker, K. H. W. (1824). Die Mythologie Des Japetischen Geschlechtes, p. 114.

Nereids
Naiads
Children of Zeus
Demigods in classical mythology
Deities in the Iliad
Corinthian characters in Greek mythology